Sapura Energy Berhad (formerly known as SapuraKencana Petroleum Berhad) is a Malaysian integrated oil and gas services company based in Seri Kembangan, Selangor. Sapura Energy trades in over 20 countries, such as China, Australia, United States of America, and those in Western Africa and the Middle East, employing approximately 13,000 people. Sapura Energy's operations cover exploration, development, production, rejuvenation, decommissioning, and abandonment. The company was formed via a merger between SapuraCrest and Kencana in May 2012 and trades on the Main Market of Bursa Malaysia Securities Berhad. The company was renamed as Sapura Energy Berhad on 24 March 2017.

Core businesses

Engineering and Construction

One of Sapura Energy's core businesses is Engineering and Construction, which includes the creation of offshore platforms and marine pipelines for oil exploration. It is supported by a strategic group of assets such as pipelaying vessels, six of which are in full operation for Petróleo Brasileiro S.A. (Petrobras) in Brazil. The vessels are fitted with remotely operated vehicles (ROVs) developed and built by Total Marine Technology Pty Ltd (TMT), an Australian subsidiary of SapuraKencana.

Operations and Maintenance
Through its engineering, procurement, construction, installation, and commissioning (EPCIC) solutions, Sapura Energy also offers its clients in the oil and gas industry operations and maintenance (O&M) services. Its offshore support services ranges from topside maintenance, subsea services, brownfield rejuvenation, and geosurvey and geotechnical, to the provision of offshore support vessels.

Drilling and Completion
The world's largest owner and operator of tender rigs, Sapura Energy maintains more than 50% of the global market share. In 2013, Sapura Energy bought $2.9 billion worth of tender rigs from deepwater drilling company Seadrill, further expanding the company's tender rig business. The company has over four decades of experience in tender-assist drilling operations and drills more than 400 wells in a year.

Exploration and Production
Sapura Energy is also known for its exploration and production of oil and gas. In 2014, the company's energy division was able to lift 5.1 million barrels of oil equivalent from Peninsula Malaysia fields. In the same year, it achieved a 100% exploration success rate due to its five significant gas discoveries in Sarawak’s SK408 project, resulting in more than three trillion cubic feet of gas.

Ownership
Sapura Energy Berhad is a public limited liability company. As of 2017, the number of shareholders totals to 37,217 with Sapura Technology Sdn Bhd retaining 13.37% and the Citigroup Nominees (Tempatan) Sdn Bhd Employees Provident Fund Board holding 10.06% of the shares.

The Chairman of the Board of Directors is Hamzah Bakar while the company's President and Group Chief Executive Officer is Shahril Shamsuddin, who also serves on the board of directors and the President and Group Chief Executive Officer of Sapura Group.

See also 
 List of oilfield service companies

References

External links
 

Oil and gas companies of Malaysia
Companies based in Kuala Lumpur
Non-renewable resource companies established in 2012
2012 establishments in Malaysia
Companies listed on Bursa Malaysia